Shandong Vocational College of Industry is a public full-time general institutions of higher learning locates in Zibo City, Shandong Province, China, which belongs to Shandong Iron and Steel Group.

Timeline 
In 1959, Zhangdian Nonferrous Metal Industry School, which is the predecessor of the school, was built.

Later it was renamed as Shandong Non-ferrous Metal School, Shandong Metallurgical Industrial School and Shandong Industrial School.

In 2002, Shandong Metallurgical Workers University moved into Zibo from Jinan.

In May 2003, Shandong Vocational College of Industry was established on the basis of Shandong Industrial School and Shandong Metallurgical Workers University.

Departments set up
(Information from School Webpages)

Sister Schools 
:Nanyang Technological University
:Shandong University of Technology

References

External links 

山东工业职业学院_院校信息库_阳光高考 - 学信网
山东工业职业学院信息公开网 (The information platform of this school)

Universities and colleges in Shandong
Educational institutions established in 1959
1959 establishments in China